Aleksey Kuznetsov (born 1 November 1968) is a Russian swimmer. He competed in two events at the 1988 Summer Olympics.

References

1968 births
Living people
Russian male swimmers
Olympic swimmers of the Soviet Union
Swimmers at the 1988 Summer Olympics
Place of birth missing (living people)
Soviet male swimmers